Caitlin Mariah Hale (born February 19, 1991) is an American actress, singer, and writer. She played Marta in the cult comedy film School of Rock (2003).

Biography
Hale is the daughter of former Connecticut State Senator Gary Hale and Barbara Duncan.

Hale's passion for entertainment sparked at an early age. Local pageants, theatre productions, and commercials allowed Hale to show-case her acting, singing, and dancing-talents competitively. At age 3, she appeared in The Nutcracker at the New England Ballet Theatre, and later played the lead in Annie at Sacred Heart University. She has sung the national anthem at University of Connecticut men and women's basketball games, and the state Republican convention.

In 2002, Hale began auditioning in New York City and launched her professional acting career with a day-playing role on the soap opera All My Children. Her claim to fame was playing Marta, the giggly, blonde back-up and co-lead singer with the pigtail braids, in Richard Linklater's School of Rock (2003). Ten years after the film's release, together with Jack Black, the cast gathered in Austin, Texas, where they greeted fans on a red carpet, took part in a public re-screening of the film followed by a Q&A, after which they reunited on stage for a live music performance.

In 2013, she graduated cum laude with a Bachelor of Arts in Journalism and Public Relations from The Walter Cronkite School of Journalism and Mass Communication at Arizona State University.

Hale is currently dating her School of Rock co-star Angelo Massagli, who played security guard Frankie.

Film and television appearances

References

External links
 

1991 births
Living people
Actresses from Connecticut
American child actresses
American film actresses
People from Ansonia, Connecticut
Walter Cronkite School of Journalism and Mass Communication alumni
21st-century American women